Étienne Joseph Louis Garnier-Pagès (December 27, 1801June 23, 1841) was a French politician, born at Marseille.

Soon after his birth his father Jean Francois Garnier, a naval surgeon, died, and his mother married Simon Pagès, a college professor, by whom she had a son. The boys were brought up together, and took the double name Garnier-Pagès.

Étienne found employment first in a commercial house in Marseille, and then in an insurance office in Paris. In 1825 he began to study law, and made some mark as an advocate. A keen opponent of the Restoration, he joined various democratic societies, notably the Aide-toi, le ciel t'aidera, an organization for purifying the elections.

He took part in the revolution of July 1830; became secretary of the Aide-toi, le ciel t'aidera, whose propaganda he brought into line with his anti-monarchical ideas; and in 1831 was sent from Isère to the chamber of deputies. He was concerned in the preparation of the Compte rendu of 1832, and advocated universal suffrage. He was an eloquent speaker, and his sound knowledge of business and finance gave him a marked influence among all parties in the chamber.

His half-brother, Louis-Antoine Garnier-Pagès (1803October 31, 1878), fought on the barricades during the revolution of July.

References

1801 births
1841 deaths
Politicians from Marseille
French republicans
Members of the 2nd Chamber of Deputies of the July Monarchy
Members of the 3rd Chamber of Deputies of the July Monarchy
Members of the 4th Chamber of Deputies of the July Monarchy